Åbyhøj Church is a church in Aarhus, Denmark. The church is situated in the western Åbyhøj neighbourhood on Silkeborgvej. Åbyhøj Church is a parish church within the Church of Denmark, the Danish state church, under the Diocese of Aarhus. It is a parish church in the Åby Parish along with Åby Church and serves some 11.000 parish members.

The church was designed by the Danish architect Harald Lønborg-Jensen and inaugurated in 1945. The church is architecturally linked with a church in Løgumkloster from which Lønborg-Jensen drew inspiration. The original church spire featured a flèche but as construction took place during the Second World War there was a shortage of lead and copper which meant it could not be properly finished. In 1973 it suffered from rot and was replaced with a new and slimmer version. In the interior the altar faces north and is made of grey and yellow travertine and adorned with a gilded crucifix. Colors are kept discrete throughout the church and the floor is paved in red brick. In 1994 the church got a new organ and new windows in the choir.

The church has a cemetery which was inaugurated on 16 November 1927 with the first burial taking place December 23 of that year. The cemetery is divided around a system of paths which splits the cemetery into smaller units. The wide north-south path is the main axis of the cemetery with the church itself as the central element. Primary paths are paved while secondary are gravel.

See also
 List of churches in Aarhus

References

External links
 
 

Lutheran churches in Aarhus
Churches in the Central Denmark Region
Churches completed in 1945
Churches in the Diocese of Aarhus